Poland competed at the 1948 Summer Olympics in London, England. 37 competitors, 30 men and 7 women, took part in 26 events in 5 sports.

Medalists

Athletics

Men
Field events

Women
Field events

Boxing

Men

Canoeing

Sprint
Men

Fencing

Seven fencers, six men and one woman, represented Poland in 1948.

Men

Women

Art competitions

References

External links
Official Olympic Reports
International Olympic Committee results database

Nations at the 1948 Summer Olympics
1948
1948 in Polish sport